Choondakkari is a 1977 Indian Malayalam film, directed by P. Vijayan and produced by Santhoshkumar. The film stars Adoor Bhasi, Anupama, Vijayaraj and Abutty in the lead roles. The film has musical score by Kannur Rajan.

Cast

Adoor Bhasi
Chakkittayil Udayakumar
Anupama
Vijayaraj
Abutty
Nilambur Balan
Praveena
Salam Karassery
Adoor Pankajam
Amir Khan
Kani Bava
Kayyalam
Kuttyedathi Vilasini
Lavanya
Ravi Menon
Vijayalakshmi

Soundtrack
The music was composed by Kannur Rajan and the lyrics were written by Monu.

References

External links
 

1977 films
1970s Malayalam-language films